Ankify is a peninsula located in the district of Ambanja, region of Diana in northern Madagascar. A small harbour allows boardings to these destinations. At its very north end, the village named Doany is bordered by a coral reef.

Access 

A 20 km road, recently refurbished, leads from Ambanja. It meanders through plantations of cocoa, coffee and ylang ylang, crosses the mangroves on a dyke to the port and finishes at the village of Doany.  Ankify can be reached by boat from Nosy Be at the docking port or, at high tide, at the village of Doany.

Economy 

The main activity is the port, it is mainly a starting point for freight and passengers to Nosy Be. The coastal villages are home to groups of fishermen whose catches supply the city of Ambanja. The mountain is dotted with small fruit farms. In recent years, thanks to hotels at Doany, tourism becomes a resource for residents.

Tourism 

A few hotels located beyond the port, provide the opportunity to stay on this site still preserved from the hustle of tourism. Visitor can enjoy snorkeling along the coral reef at Doany. This is also the starting point for excursions to the islands and the still wild Ampasindava Bay

Ecology 

It is a hotbed for animal and botanical diversity. One may meet, among other varieties: 
Chameleons: variety of Furcifer, especially the famous Furcifer Pardalis 
Lemur: mainly the Black Lemur but also the Brown Maki 
Sea Turtles: on the coral reef near Doany 
Mangrove Dolphins: along the north coast, beyond the port.

References

External links 
 Photos of the peninsula

Islands of Madagascar
Populated places in Diana Region